Oo Yin Mhu Phit Phu Chin The is a Burmese drama television series. It aired on MRTV-4, from December 14, 2017 to January 19, 2018, on Mondays to Fridays at 19:00 for 28 episodes.

Cast
Kyaw Hsu as Ye Jar
Khay Sett Thwin as Zun Pann
Poe Kyar Phyu Khin as Wai Wai Aung, Sayarma Ma Wai
Hein Htet as Htet Yan
Thet Oo Ko as Htet Naing

References

Burmese television series
MRTV (TV network) original programming